Ryan Michael Connolly (born 13 January 1992) is an Irish professional footballer who last played for Treaty United in the League of Ireland First Division. Connolly previously played for Football League Championship side Derby County. He plays in midfield and has represented the Republic of Ireland at U-16 level.

Club career

Derby County
Connolly began his career as a scholar in the Derby County Academy, and had his first experience of first team football came when he was named as a substitute for Derby County's FA Cup 5th Round tie at home to Birmingham City in February 2010 before making his full debut as a late substitute in Derby's 2–0 victory over Cardiff City on the final day of the 2009–10 season. Although primarily involved with the youth team – scoring twice in a 6–1 win over Peterborough United in the FA Youth Cup -Connolly also appeared for the Derby County Reserves side which won the 2009–10 Central League Central Section title, starting three of his nine appearances and scoring the winner in a 1–0 win over Sheffield Wednesday. He was named as Derby's Scholar of the Year for the 2009/10 season and signed his first professional deal with the club on 8 July 2010.

Connolly's career suffered a setback when he suffered a cruciate ligament injury during an Under 18's friendly in August 2010, which ruled him out for six months. Despite this setback he was given a new one-year contract extension, alongside compariate Jeff Hendrick, in January 2011 to take him through until Summer 2012. He returned to competitive action on 3 May 2011 when he appeared as a second-half substitute in Derby County reserves 4–0 victory at Sheffield United, which clinched the club's second consecutive totesport Central League title.

Ayr United
On 31 August 2011, Connolly joined Scottish First Division side Ayr United on loan until 31 December 2011. Connolly spent the majority of his time at Ayr on the substitutes bench as he featured 12 times for The Honest Men. Connolly was named on the Derby County substitute bench in a 2–0 defeat at Brighton & Hove Albion on 20 March 2012, being allocated squad number 34.

Sligo Rovers
Connolly signed for Sligo Rovers in June 2012.

Galway United
On 9 January 2014, it was announced that Ryan had signed for Galway United ahead of the 2014 season.

Shamrock Rovers
Connolly spent the 2017 season with Shamrock Rovers making four appearances in the 2017–18 UEFA Europa League.

Galway United
Connolly re-signed with Galway United in December 2017 ahead of the 2018 League of Ireland First Division season. He made his League debut for The Tribesmen in their 4–1 win over Athlone Town on Friday, 23 February.

Finn Harps
In December 2019, Connolly was announced as having joined Finn Harps for the 2020 League of Ireland Premier Division season. He scored the winning goal in the opening round of the 2020 FAI Cup against St. Patrick's Athletic.

Treaty United
League of Ireland First Division side Treaty United announced that they had signed Connolly for the 2023 season on 15 December 2022 after three years with Finn Harps. On 14 February 2023, it was then announced that he had left the club before the start of the season, due to work commitments.

International career
He has represented the Republic of Ireland at Under 15, 16 and Under 17 level. He was called up to the Republic of Ireland Under 19 for the first time, alongside fellow Derby County player Jeff Hendrick, on 29 July 2010.

Honours
Sligo Rovers
League of Ireland Premier Division (1): 2012

References

External links

1992 births
Living people
Association footballers from County Mayo
Republic of Ireland association footballers
Association football midfielders
Derby County F.C. players
Ayr United F.C. players
English Football League players
Scottish Football League players
Sligo Rovers F.C. players
Longford Town F.C. players
Galway United F.C. players
Shamrock Rovers F.C. players
League of Ireland players
People from Castlebar
Finn Harps F.C. players
Treaty United F.C. players